Dabhosa Waterfall is a waterfall situated in the village of Dabhosa in Jawhar Tehsil, Palghar district, Maharashtra, India. This is one of the highest waterfalls situated near Mumbai. This waterfall  is located over the Lendi River and cascades down from a height of 300 feet. Dabhosa Waterfall is a beautiful waterfall especially during the monsoon season.

Dabhosha Waterfall is an adventurous spot for kayaking, trekking, valley crossing, and fishing.

References

Waterfalls of Maharashtra